This is a list of people associated with the Jawaharlal Nehru University. Excluded are those people whose only connection with JNU is that they were awarded an honorary degree.

Alumni

Arts

Politics and Law

Heads of State and Government

Others

Humanities and Social Sciences

Military and police

Science and Technology

Others 

 Brahma Chellaney, columnist and author on geostrategic affairs
 Harun Rashid Khan, Deputy Governor of Reserve Bank of India (2011 to 2016)
 Umesh Upadhyay,  President & Director Media at Reliance Industries Limited
 Pankaj Mishra, novelist and essayist.
 Ashok Kumar Sarangi, Chief Vigilance Officer and CGM-in-Charge, Reserve Bank of India
 Jawed Habib, hairdresser and businessman
 Geetanjali Shree, Novelist and short-story writer, winner of International Booker prize

Faculty

References 

Jawaharlal Nehru University
Jawaharlal_Nehru_University_people
Delhi-related lists